Chandpole metro station is a metro station on the Pink Line of the Jaipur Metro. It was opened on June 3, 2015. It serves Chandpole, a colony in the city of Jaipur.

Station layout

See also

References

External links
 UrbanRail.Net — descriptions of all metro systems in the world, each with a schematic map showing all stations.

2015 establishments in Rajasthan
Jaipur Metro stations